Thomas Evans (28 November 1907 – 1993) was a professional footballer.

Evans was born in Ton Pentre, and played for Ton Pentre, Leytonstone, Northfleet, Tottenham Hotspur and West Bromwich Albion.

Playing career 
Evans began his career at Welsh club Ton Pentre before joining non league Leytonstone. In 1927 he made the move to Tottenham Hotspur which was to be his first spell at White Hart Lane. Evans joined Spurs nursery club Northfleet United  before rejoining the Spurs in 1929. The right half featured in 101 games and scored on four occasions for the club in all competitions. After leaving the Spurs in 1936, Evans ended his career at West Bromwich Albion.

References 

1907 births
1993 deaths
People from Pentre
Sportspeople from Rhondda Cynon Taf
Welsh footballers
English Football League players
Tottenham Hotspur F.C. players
West Bromwich Albion F.C. players
Ton Pentre F.C. players
Association football defenders